Enerthenema is a genus of slime molds in the family Amaurochaetaceae. As of 2015, there are four species in the genus.

References

Myxogastria
Amoebozoa genera